Susan E. Mango is an American biologist, the former H.A. and Edna Benning Professor of Oncological Sciences at the University of Utah, and former professor at Harvard University. She is Professor of Cell and Developmental Biology and research group leader at Biozentrum University of Basel

Mango graduated from Harvard University, and from Princeton University with a Ph.D. She was a postdoctoral research fellow in the lab of Judith Kimble at the University of Wisconsin-Madison.

She and her team are currently studying the cells of the worm C. elegans to observe how a cell transforms from a pluripotent state into a particular cell type.
Her articles have been published in Nature, Science, Cell, and PLoS Biology.

Awards
2008 MacArthur Fellows Program

References

External links
Research group website
"Susan Mango", Faculty of 1000
"Susan Mango Tracks Organ Development in the Worm", MCB News, Cathryn Delude

21st-century American biologists
Biozentrum University of Basel
MacArthur Fellows
Harvard University alumni
Princeton University alumni
University of Utah faculty
Harvard University faculty
Living people
Year of birth missing (living people)